Tigre Hank (born 30 September 1991 in Tijuana) is a Mexican tennis player. Hank has a career high ATP singles ranking of 416, achieved on 23 November 2015. Hank made his ATP main draw debut at the 2014 Abierto Mexicano Telcel, where he lost in the first round to Sam Querrey in three sets. He has represented his country in four separate Davis Cup ties, most recently in 2015 against Chile. His father is businessman Jorge Hank Rhon.

External links

1991 births
Living people
Mexican male tennis players
Sportspeople from Tijuana